Brahma Janen Gopon Kommoti is a 2020 Indian Bengali drama film, which is the directorial debut of Aritra Mukherjee and produced by Windows Production. It stars Ritabhari Chakraborty, Ambarish Bhattacharya, Manasi Sinha and Subhasish Mukherjee. This film was released on 6 March 2020.

Synopsis 
The film revolves around the life of Shabari and her right to performing priesthood, dealing with menstrual taboos and standing up against the concept of Kanyadan. Shabari is a lecturer, performing artiste and priest. She picked up the art of priesthood from her father. When a chance encounter with Vikramaditya at a college function leads to a marriage proposal, she tells the would-be groom that she does puja among other things. Her words are misinterpreted for the usual puja that women perform at home. After her marriage, Shabari is forced to keep her identity under wraps due to the stark differences between her worlds, pre and post marriage. Will she be able to continue being a priest against all odds or will she be forced to give up faced with opposition by a patriarchal society? All the more when women in their menstrual age are not allowed to perform pujas! Brahma Janen Gopon Kommoti makes one ponder over the outdated rites and rituals and questions the gender imbalance in society.

Cast 
 Ritabhari Chakraborty as Shabari
 Soham Majumdar as Bikramaditya
 Manasi Sinha as Gurudasi
 Subhasish Mukherjee as Purohit Moshai
 Soma Banerjee as Amrabati
 Ambarish Bhattacharya as Pratapaditya
 Iman Chakraborty as Uma in a Special Appearance
 Tanika Basu

Release 
It was theatrically released on 6 March 2020. It had a short theatrical run till the 25th of March, 2020, due to the country-wide lockdown for COVID-19. However, it ran to packed houses across Bengal in that short period of time. The film enjoyed 50+ houseful shows back to back on the first Sunday of its release, even some theatres had back to back packed shows. Later it had its world television premiere on the 14th of February, 2021 and is also available on OTT platforms.  It was screened at 51st International Film Festival of India in January 2021 in Indian Panorama section.

Reception

The Calcutta high court  in a recent order has held that “Hinduism is a way of life and is wide enough even to accommodate atheists, agnostics as well as all shades of religious and spiritual beliefs”. The court also said, "In the event, the Hindu religion was so fragile and wounded so easily, it would not have survived over the ages through various onslaughts, as borne out by history." Justice Sabyasachi Bhattacharyya's six-page order on March 6 nullified a plea against the film for "hurting Hindu religious sentiments" by linking Brahma with 'gopon kommoti', which means 'the secret act'. Petitioner Subhadep Adhikari also argued that the filmmakers should be prosecuted under penal sections which deal with hurting religious sentiment with a malicious intent.

Controversy
Bengali writer Debarati Mukhopadhyay claimed that the plot of the movie was copied from her book Diotima without giving any attributions. Shiboprosad Mukherjee and Nandita Roy informed that Debarati's claim is baseless and Windows Production filed a suit of 10 crores against Debarati Mukhopadhyay. Smt. Mukhopadhyay also stated that she has filed a counter suit against the production house for plagiarism, copyright violation worth 50 Crores. She also filed a defamation suit against the script writer of the film for humiliating her.

Soundtrack 

The soundtrack is composed by Anindya Chatterjee on his own lyrics.

References

External links 
 

2020 films
Bengali-language Indian films
Indian drama films
2020s Bengali-language films
2020 drama films